Heliothela is a genus of moths of the family Crambidae.

Species
Heliothela aterrima Turner, 1937
Heliothela atra (Butler, 1877)
Heliothela didymospila Turner, 1915
Heliothela floricola Turner, 1913
Heliothela nigralbata Leech, 1889
Heliothela ophideresana (Walker, 1863)
Heliothela oreias Turner, 1915
Heliothela paracentra (Meyrick, 1887)
Heliothela wulfeniana (Scopoli, 1763)

Former species
Heliothela cretostrigalis Caradja, 1925

References

Heliothelini
Crambidae genera
Taxa named by Achille Guenée